Vitali Novikov (born 13 January 1979) is a Russian former competitive ice dancer. With Svetlana Kulikova, he is the 2003 Nebelhorn Trophy champion.

Career 
Early in his career, Novikov skated with Anastasia Grebenkina, Ekaterina Gvozdikova, and Mackenzie Moliver.

Novikov teamed up with Svetlana Kulikova in January 2003. They won the first competition they entered as a team, the 2003 Nebelhorn Trophy. They won two medals at the Russian Championships and competed twice at the European and World Championships. Their best results were 7th at 2005 Europeans and 13th at 2004 Worlds. Kulikova and Novikov were coached by Tatiana Tarasova and Evgeni Platov. They parted ways after placing 14th at the 2005 World Championships.

Novikov teamed up with Olga Orlova in spring 2005. They placed 6th at the 2005 Cup of Russia and 5th at the 2006 Russian Championships.

Novikov currently works as a coach.

Programs 
(with Kulikova)

Results 
GP: Grand Prix; JGP: Junior Grand Prix

With Orlova

With Kulikova

With Grebenkina

References

External links 

 
 

Russian male ice dancers
1979 births
Living people
Figure skaters from Moscow